This is a list of works (films, television, shorts, etc.) by the South Korean production company Playlist Studio.

Films

Television series

Love Playlist

The first series produced by Playlist Studio is Love Playlist, which premiered on March 9, 2017, and lasted for four seasons, until its final broadcast, on August 10, 2019. In each episode it depicts the experiences and thoughts of people in their 20s related to love and deals with the process of falling in love with a person, starting a relationship, ending unrequited love, and a couple breaking up because of a misunderstanding. The cast features Kim Hyung-seok as Lee Hyun-seung, Jung Shin-hye as Jung Ji-won, Lee Yoo-jin as Han Jae-in, Choi Hee-seung as Kim Min-woo, Lim Hwi-jin as Kwak Jun-mo, Park Jung-woo as Kang Yoon, Min Hyo-won as Kim Do-yeong, Bae Hyun-sung as Park Ha-neul and Kim Sae-ron as Seo Ji-min who joined the line up in season 4. In season 4, it depicts various stories of characters who went on to adapt not only to love, but also friendship, military enlistment, and awkward social adjustment after being discharged from the military were unfolded. The drama also features original soundtrack (OST) by Brother Su and Cosmic Girls' Yoo Yeon-jung, Paul Kim, Kim Na-young, 10cm, MeloMance's Kim Min-seok, Exo-CBX, and Suran. For season 1 and 2, Facebook was the main platform, and YouTube was the main platform in season 3 and 4.

Pu Reum's Vlog (also known as Love Playlist Season 3.5) was a surprise release on March 1, 2019, with a preview of the upcoming season 4.

The drama became massively popular in South Korea and internationally leading this to the 'Yeon-Fly-Lee' syndrome. They later held a fan meeting at the White Wave Art Center in Seoul on August 18, 2017, with more than 300 fans attending. The event drew attraction with more than 17,000 people participating in the invitation event. Love Playlist ended with total views for the four seasons exceeded 650 million views. As of July 2021, the series exceeded 700 million views.

Dear. M is a spin-off of Love Playlist. It tells the stories of students at Seoyeon University trying to find 'M', the anonymous writer of the school community article that turned the school upside down. Originally planned for a February 2021 broadcast, it has since been postponed due to the controversy involving its lead actress Park Hye-su.

Seventeen
Following the success of Love Playlist, Seventeen depicts an unforgettable first love centre on a group of close-knit friends love between a college student and a young man.

Yellow
Titled Yellow, the drama starred deals with the love of anxious youth in an indie band and their charismatic tag-along photographer. The drama premiered on September 12 – October 12, 2017. The drama starred Kim Do-wan (Nam Ji-hoon, the leader), Kim Kwan-soo (Song Tae-min, the guitarist), Kim Hae-woo (Ja Pi, the drummer), Lee Se-jin (Park Dong-woo, the bassist), Ji Ye-eun (Cho Soo-a, the photographer) and Kim Ye-ji (Lee Yeo-reum). The drama features OST from Mamamoo's Wheein, Melomance, and Car, the Garden Yellow received a total of 28 million views in Korea alone, and an average of 4.66 million views per episode. Later, it reached a total of 43 million views in November 2017.

Flower Ever After
Flower Ever After is a romance drama about a marriage in the 20s and 30s. It starred five people with different charms; Lee Ho-jung as Han So-young, a newcomer loved by everyone for her natural sense, Choi Hee-jin as Ko Go-chae, a cute job seeker who has been in a long-term relationship for 7 years, Jung Geon-joo as Choi Woong, who is a beast but warm only in front of his woman, Ahn Si-eun, who plays the good Gong Ji-hyo, and Kang Hoon, who plays Yoo Hyeon-soo, a gentleman who dreams of marrying the woman he loves. The series recorded 800,000 views, the highest number of views in the shortest time.

A-Teen

A-Teen is a web drama that gained explosive popularity among teenagers aged 13 to 19 which aired for the first time in July 2018. It has been said that it captured the concerns of teenagers, including dating and unrequited love. The drama recorded the highest number of views of 4.38 million on YouTube. As of December 2019, the series garnered a total cumulative number of 480 million views.

Just One Bite
Just One Bite released on July 19, 2018, and ended on April 6, 2019, is starred by Kim Ji-in, Seo Hye-won, Jo Hye-joo, Park Seo-ham, Lee Shin-young, Park Seon-jae, Han Kyu-won and Lee Seong-ha. The drama shows three women who laugh and chat while looking for restaurants. It drew the sympathy of many people by depicting realistic mukbang and friendship and love of women in their 20s.

In Seoul
In Seoul tells a realistic story of two mothers and daughters who clash from room cleaning to college.

XX

As of the beginning of 2021, the cumulative number of viewers of XX reached about 100 million.

Twenty-Twenty
Twenty-Twenty is a drama by director Han Su-ji, who directed the web drama A-Teen. This is Han Seong-min's first lead role, who has been working as a magazine model, and the female lead, Chae Da-hee, who he plays, is a character who has lived as her mother has set her up. Kim Woo-seok, a member of the idol group UP10TION, takes on the role of Lee Hyun-jin, a male lead who creates a music crew and pursues his dreams independently without the help of his parents.

Plans
Plans also known as Plans: Seoyeon University x Revan is a side story of Love Playlist and Flower Ever After. Released on July 10, 2021, on the Playlist's official YouTube channel, the video revolved Love Playlist after two years. Starring Lee Yoo-jin (Jae In), an intern at Revan Company meets Kim Hyung-seok (Hyun Seung) and Choi Hee-seung (Min Woo) after a long time at Seoyeon University for a job interview with her senior Kang Hoon (Hyun Soo). As the main web drama protagonists of the playlist gathered in one place, the number of views of the video reached 790,000 within four days of its release.

Blue Birthday

Directed by Park Dan-hee and written by Goo So-yeon and Moon Won-young, Blue Birthday it is a work that challenged new genres and materials by reuniting with the production team, who had gathered topics with ending series such as The Best Ending (2019) and Ending Again (2020). The drama starred Kim Ye-rim of Red Velvet and Hongseok of Pentagon, tells a fantasy romance thriller drama in which the female protagonists revisit the past through mysterious photos left by her first love, who died on her birthday 10 years ago. The drama consists of three songs, including remakes of two popular Korean songs that were released in 2011, Beast's "On Rainy Days" (re-recorded and sung by Heize) and Lucia with Epitone Project's "Any Day, Any Words" (re-recorded and sung by O3ohn). The third and original song of the drama, "It's You" is recorded by Colde

Peng
The drama depicts the romance of a woman entering her 30s in which four different men appear in the life of the main protagonist, Go Sa-ri (Yoon So-hee). Go Sa-ri who is trying to start fresh as she says goodbye to her 20s faces a difficult situation when her ex-boyfriend Jeon Woo-sang (Lee Seung-il), a younger guy Yeon Ha-rim (Kim Hyun-jin), her best friend Pi Jung-won (Choi Won-myung), and her boss Ki Sun-jae (Joo Woo-jae) simultaneously try to win her over. Peng premieres on October 7, 2021, through YouTube and Watcha.

A DeadbEAT's Meal
The story of Jae Ho's growth in healing a series of job failures and parting pains with food. It is based on the popular webtoon of the same name. Ha Seok-jin takes on the role of Kim Jae-ho, an involuntary man who is preparing for a job for the second year after graduating from the Department of Korean Literature, after five years of public examination. Go Won-hee takes on the role of Yeo Eun-ho, a hot-tempered voluntary white man who claims that eating is all that is left in today's low-interest rates. Im Hyun-joo as the role of Seo Soo-jeong, an employee of a large telecommunication company in her second year of social life.

Weak Hero Class 1

The drama is based on Naver webtoon Weak Hero by writer Seopass and illustrated by Kim Jin-seok (Razen), which was published in 2018. It stars Park Ji-hoon, Choi Hyun-wook, and Hong Kyung, directed and written by Yoo Soo-min and Han Jun-hee as the creative director. The series revolves around a weak-looking boy, who fights against numerous violence with his friends. Three episodes out of eight were screened at 27th Busan International Film Festival in 'On Screen' section. It aired exclusively as Wavve Original on November 18, 2022. The series was met with praise by critics and audiences for its production and solid actors' performances.

Frequent collaborators
This table lists actors who appear as different characters in more than one television series.

Recurring cast and characters
This table lists the characters who will appear or have appeared in more than one television series in Playlist Universe.

  = Main role   = Supporting role    = Guest role

Notable guests

 Paul Kim
 Na Jae-min (NCT Dream)
 Lee Je-no (NCT Dream)
 Ahn Ji-young (Bolbbalgan4)
 JeA (Brown Eyed Girls)
 Hyun Woo-jin
 Joshua (Seventeen)
 Kim Min-ju (Iz*One)
 Hyunjin (Stray Kids)
 I.N (Stray Kids)
 Lee Han-wi
 Ahn Se-ha
 Kim Hye-yoon
 Go Woo-ri
 Jung Soo-young
 Cha Yeob
 Jeon No-min
 Yoon Yoo-sun
 Kim Jung-hak
 Song Seon-mi
 Kenta (JBJ95)
 Lena
 Yeonjun (Tomorrow X Together)
 Young K (Day6)
 Wonpil (Day6) 
 Jaejae
 May (Cherry Bullet)
 Remi (Cherry Bullet)
 Haeyoon (Cherry Bullet)
 Wooyeon (Woo!ah!)
 Park Sung-hoon (Enhypen)
 Kim Woo-seok (Up10tion)

Notes

References

Playlist Studio
Lists of internet series